Sir David Stanley Smith (11 February 1888 – 29 December 1982) was a New Zealand lawyer, judge and educationalist.

Smith was born in Dunedin, Otago, New Zealand in 1888. He worked for Charles Morison as an assistant from 1912. He  Smith was appointed as a judge to the Supreme Court in 1928, a relatively early appointment based on his performance as counsel for Maori land claims. Smith received a knighthood in the 1948 New Year Honours. A few months later, he resigned as a judge and concentrated on public affairs.

Smith was a member of the Victoria University College Council (1939–1945) and in 1945 became chancellor of the University of New Zealand. For his services to tertiary education, he received honorary doctorates from the University of Oxford (1948) and the University of New Zealand (1961).

He died in Wellington on 29 December 1982 and his ashes were buried at Karori Cemetery. His daughter, Shirley Smith, became a lawyer.

References

1888 births
1982 deaths
Lawyers from Dunedin
High Court of New Zealand judges
Academic staff of the University of New Zealand
Burials at Karori Cemetery
New Zealand Knights Bachelor
20th-century New Zealand  lawyers